William Adam Wilson FRSE (28 July 1928 – 14 March 1994) was a 20th-century Scottish lawyer who served as Professor of Scots Law att Edinburgh University. He was known in authorship as W. A. Wilson and informally as Bill Wilson.

Edinburgh University's W. A. Wilson Memorial Lecture inaugurated in 1995, is named in his honour.

Life
He was born in Glasgow on 28 July 1928 the son of Hugh Wilson and his wife, Anne adam. He was educated at Hillhead High School.

He studied Law at Glasgow University graduating MA in 1948 and an LL.B. in 1951. He then practiced for several years as a solicitor before becoming a lecturer at Edinburgh University in 1960, being made a Senior lecturer in 1965. In 1972 he became the first Lord President Reid Professor of Law at the university. He became Dean of the Law Faculty in 1976.

In 1991 he was elected a Fellow of the Royal Society of Edinburgh. His proposers were Neil MacCormick, Kemp Davidson, Lord Davidson, Michael Yeoman, and John Terence Coppock.

He died in Edinburgh of cancer on 14 March 1994.

W. A. Wilson Memorial Lectures

Lord Rodger, (Lord Advocate) (1995) – "Thinking About Scots Law"
James Gordley (University of California, Berkeley) (1996) – "Contract and Delict"
Sir Anthony Mason (Chief Justice, high Court of Australia) (1997) – "Negligence and the Liability of Public Authorities"
Eric Clive (Scottish Law Commission) (1998) – "Law Making in Scotland"
Joe Thomson (Scottish Law Commission) (1999) – ?
Keith Ewing (King's College, London) (2000) – "Constitutional Reform and Human Rights"
Shael Herman (Tulane University) (2002) – "Specific Performance: a Comparative Analysis"
Horatia Muir Watt (Sorbonne University) (2004) – "European Integration"
Vernon Palmer (Tulane University) (2007) – "Two Rival Theories of Mixed Legal Systems"
Lord Hope of Craighead (Lord of Appeal in Ordinary) (2008) – "The Strange Habits of the English"
Hector MacQueen (Edinburgh University) (2009) – "Scotland's First Woman Law Graduates"
Lionel Smith (McGill University) (2010) – "Scottish Trusts in the Common Law"
George Gretton (Edinburgh University) (2012) – "On Law Commissioning and Other things"
Robert Stevens (Oxford University) (2012) – "Insults"
Reinhard Zimmermann (Max Planck Institute) (2013) – "Damages in European Contract Law"
David Snyder (Washington College of Law) (2014) – "Metamophoses in the Law of Contract"
John Blackie (University of Strathclyde) (2015) – "Historically Informed Law Reform"

Publications
Trusts, Trustees and Executors (1975)
Debt (1982)
Introductory Essay on Scots Law (1984)

References

1926 births
1994 deaths
Lawyers from Glasgow
People educated at Hillhead High School
Alumni of the University of Glasgow
Academics of the University of Edinburgh
Scottish solicitors
Fellows of the Royal Society of Edinburgh
20th-century Scottish lawyers